The Defender  is a children's novel by Nicholas Kalashnikoff. Set deep within the mountains of Siberia, the novel is about an ostracized shepherd who defends the mountain rams from hunters. The novel, illustrated by Claire Louden and George Louden, was first published in 1951 and was a Newbery Honor recipient in 1952.

Plot
The story is about a Lamut (Evens) named Turgen whose family was killed by an illness which left him alone to his practice of medicine in his Yurt. He then out of his loneliness befriends a group of rams near his yurt this cause the townspeople to look at him and start strange rumors that it is impossible for a man to befriend animals so he must be a sorcerer and shunned because of it. While on coming back from his usual fishing and hunting round he hears crying and decides to help he goes inside the yurt to see 2 children. The eldest one Tim approached Turgen and with all his kindness stayed to tend to the youngest child Aska as she was only but an infant. As time past Marfa the mother of the children came from working to see Turgen tending to her children rather than being angry she was just surprised to find him in her home. As it turns out one of the people who didn't listen to the shamans words was Marfa's late husband who left marfa with some enlightening information that Turgen was a kind man that helped anyone that needed and that the shaman only spoke lies and this was proven to her as she came to see him tending to her children. From that point he frequently dropped by to see Marfa and he children bringing them meats, and salts to make sure that marfa did not need to work so hard and with that she was able to spend more time with her children. With these visits Turgen's story about his past affiliation with the rams on how he hunted them for sport and that cause great sorrow in him to see these creatures being hunter for their horns and meats even though they were minding their own business. With this gap of trust between them Turgen set out to create a wall of trust with the ram which he achieved by feeding them every day. As time passed he began to bond with the herd of ram and watched them as they at his food offering and when the rams had encounters with other dangerous creatures like bears and wolves Turgen did everything in his power to help the rams with their fight even if it meant risking his life. In the middle of September hunting season began this is where Turgen's struggle's begin as hunters start to come to the mountains and they are specifically looking for the rams to hunt. Turgen places the responsibilities of guiding the rams to a safer spot in the mountains. With the help of Marfa and her children he was able to lead the rams to safety while being watched by the hunter they threaten his life because of his actions. This is when Marfa stood up and pleaded to hunter to listen to reason and why Turgen had see the rams through. As they listen they were reminded of the shamans words and ignored er words this is when Turgen stood and talk sense to the hunter and told them how the shamans words should not be headed since he was visited by spirit for helping the rams as the Lamut were very religious they believed a spirit haunted Turgen and now believed he was free since the rams were gone. In the end Turgen was accepted back to the village and married Marfa and was able to live normal life.

Characters
Turgen - An exiled man accuse of sorcery who befriends a group of rams, and later the defender of the rams.
Shamanist - A jealous village shaman who starts the rumor of Turgen's sorcery.
Marfa - A widowed Lamut who does not believe the rumor told about Turgen, and befriends him in his time of need.
Tim - Marfa's first-born son.
Aska - Marfa's second-born daughter.
The Rams - The rams that Turgen protects and feeds throughout the story consist of 3 females, 4 males including the leader, and 2 baby rams.

References

1951 American novels
American children's novels
Newbery Honor-winning works
Novels set in Siberia
Children's novels about animals
Charles Scribner's Sons books
1951 children's books